William John Herbert Arthur (14 February 1863 – 27 November 1930) was an English footballer who played for Blackburn Rovers, as well as the English national side.

Background
In 1884 a correspondent of the Blackburn Times wrote the following about Arthur: "As a goalkeeper does not rank as a brilliant or tricky player, but he has the better quality of being safe, and whether engaged in important or small matches is invariably on the alert to prevent the scoring of any point against his side. That so few goals have been recorded against him in matches with powerful teams speaks well for his reliability". Another reference confirms that Arthur was more about position rather than panache.

Season 1888-1889
Arthur made his League debut on 15 September 1888, in goal, at Leamington Road, then home of Blackburn Rovers, against Accrington. The match ended in a 5–5 draw. Arthur played 15, of the 22 League matches played by Blackburn Rovers in season 1888–89. As a goalkeeper he played in a defence-line that kept two clean sheets and kept the opposition to one-in-a-match on three separate occasions. Arthur played for Blackburn Rovers in the two FA Cup semi-final matches played against Wolverhampton Wanderers. The first match ended 1-1. Blackburn Rovers lost the replay 3–1. See 1887–88 FA Cup.

Other information
Arthur was involved in an extraordinary incident during the First Division match against Burnley in December 1891, at Turf Moor.

The match was played in terrible conditions, with driving wind and rain. At half-time Burnley were leading 3–0. After the ten-minute interval, the Burnley players returned to the pitch, but there was no sign of the Rovers players, who seemed uninterested in continuing the game. Referee JC Clegg waited four minutes, and then started the second half, even though not all Rovers players were on the pitch. After two players were sent off early in the half, all of the Rovers players, except Arthur, left the field. The referee did not stop the game, thus making Arthur play against the eleven Burnley players.

Arthur quickly realised that all of the Burnley players were automatically offside, as there were never two Rovers players between them and the Rovers goal. He appealed to referee Clegg, who abandoned the game, realising the farcical situation that the game had become.

References

External links
Player profile at EnglandStats.com
Profile photo

1863 births
1930 deaths
English footballers
England international footballers
Blackburn Rovers F.C. players
Association football goalkeepers
FA Cup Final players